Klene is a traditional brand of liquorice confectionery, founded in 1876 by Johannes Coenradus Klene in Rotterdam, and sold primarily in the Netherlands. It is as of 1999 owned by Perfetti Van Melle.

Varieties
Klene has several different production lines including:
 Geldlijn (Money line)
 Suikervrij (Sugarfree)
 Klene Mixen (Klene Mixes)
 Snoeperig drop (Candylike liquorice)
 Mijn Persoonlijke Selectie (My personal selection)
 Wybert

References

External links

Brand name confectionery
Perfetti Van Melle brands
1876 introductions